Dhammazedi (c. 1409–1492, reigned 1471 to 1492) was the 16th king of the Hanthawaddy Kingdom in Burma. Considered one of the most enlightened rulers in Burmese history, by some accounts call him "the greatest" of all Hanthawaddy kings. The former Buddhist monk, educated in the rival kingdom of Ava in his youth, was a trusted adviser and son-in-law of Queen Shin Sawbu. At age 48, he left the monkhood after he was selected by Shin Sawbu as the heir apparent, and was married to one of the queen's daughters. He immediately became the de facto ruler of the kingdom as Shin Sawbu handed over all administrative duties to him.

During Dhammazedi's long reign, the Mon-speaking kingdom reached the peak of its golden age. Under his wise rule, the kingdom, unlike the rival Ava Kingdom, was peaceful, and profited greatly from foreign commerce. His reign was a time of peace and he himself was a mild ruler, famous for his wisdom. A collection of his rulings, Dhammazedi Pyatton, survives. The kingdom also became a famous center of Theravada Buddhism, with strong ties to Ceylon, and resumed the practice of sending missions to Buddhagaya. His religious reforms later spread throughout the country. He maintained friendly relations with Yunnan.

According to DGE Hall, "He was a Buddhist ruler of the best type, deeply solicitous for the purification of religion. Under him civilization flourished, and the condition of the Mon country stands out in sharp contrast with the disorder and savagery which characterized the Ava kingdom."

He died in 1492. He was honored as a saint and a pagoda was erected over his bones. He was succeeded by his eldest son Binnya Ran II.

Historiography
Various Burmese chronicles report different dates for the key events of his life.

Commemorations 

Dhammazedi Road, a road in Yangon.

See also 

 Great Bell of Dhammazedi
 Kalyani Inscriptions

Notes

References

Bibliography
 
 
 
 
 
 
 
 

Hanthawaddy dynasty
1492 deaths
1409 births
15th-century Burmese monarchs